Javier Delgado may refer to:

Javier Delgado (1951–2002), born José Fedor Rey, Colombian guerilla leader
Javier Delgado (Costa Rican footballer) (born 1968), Costa Rican football manager and former defender
Javier Delgado (Uruguayan footballer) (born 1975), Uruguayan football midfielder
Javier Delgado (Modern Family), fictional character on American sitcom Modern Family